The women's  individual pursuit track cycling events at the 2020 Summer Paralympics will take place between August 25 to 28 2021 at the Izu Velodrome, Japan. Four events will take place in the women's event also over six classifications. One of those four events spanned multiple classifications were 'factored' events, with final times adjusted in line with classification to ensure fairness. The distances of all events are 3000m.

Classification
Cyclists are given a classification depending on the type and extent of their disability. The classification system allows cyclists to compete against others with a similar level of function. The class number indicates the severity of impairment with "1" being most impaired.

Cycling classes are:
B: Blind and visually impaired cyclists use a Tandem bicycle with a sighted pilot on the front
C 1-5: Cyclists with an impairment that affects their legs, arms, and/or trunk but are capable of using a standard bicycle

Schedule

Medal table

Medal summary

References

Women's individual pursuit